Daniel Milanovski (born April 4, 1987) is a former Macedonian professional basketball Small forward.

Professional career
He is a former member of MZT Skopje, Pelister, AMAK SP, Vardar and Strumica.

External links
 Daniel Milanovski at eurobasket.com

References

1987 births
Living people
Macedonian men's basketball players
Small forwards